Vermeijius retiarus is a species of sea snail, a marine gastropod mollusk in the family Fasciolariidae, the spindle snails, the tulip snails and their allies.

Description
The length of the shell attains 56 mm.

Distribution
This marine species occurs in the Indian Ocean off Somalia and Madagascar.

References

External links
 Martens, E. von. (1901). Einige Neue Meer-Conchylien von der Deutschen Tiefsee-Expedition. Sitzungsberichte der Gesellschaft Naturforschender Freunde zu Berlin. (1901): 14–26
 Kantor Y.I., Fedosov A.E., Snyder M.A. & Bouchet P. (2018). Pseudolatirus Bellardi, 1884 revisited, with the description of two new genera and five new species (Neogastropoda: Fasciolariidae). European Journal of Taxonomy. 433: 1–57

Endemic fauna of Somalia
retiarus
Gastropods described in 1901